Port Carling Aerodrome  is located  southwest of Port Carling.

See also
 List of airports in the Port Carling area

References

Registered aerodromes in Ontario